Rockwell F. Jones is an American academic administrator, currently serving as the 16th and current president of Ohio Wesleyan University in Delaware, Ohio. Jones was formally inaugurated on October 10, 2008, although he served as president of the University beginning on July 1, 2008. 

Before beginning his tenure as president, Jones held the served as executive vice president and dean of advancement at Hendrix College in Conway, Arkansas, where he earned his Bachelor of Arts degree. Jones also served as vice president for enrollment and dean of admission and financial aid, interim vice president for student affairs, and chaplain at Hendrix. Jones holds a M.Div. from the Duke University Divinity School, where he graduated magna cum laude, and a Ph.D. in educational administration from the University of Texas at Austin.

References

External links
 Office of the President of Ohio Wesleyan University

Presidents of Ohio Wesleyan University
Hendrix College alumni
University of Texas at Austin College of Education alumni
Duke Divinity School alumni
Living people
Year of birth missing (living people)